Dioscorea orizabensis is a species of yam in the family Dioscoreaceae. It is native to the Jalisco and Veracruz states of Mexico. The plant is a climbing tuberous geophyte which grows in mountain forests.

References

orizabensis